John Bush (1867 – 29 June 1913) was a New Zealand cricketer. He played in one first-class match for Canterbury in 1887/88.

See also
 List of Canterbury representative cricketers

References

External links
 

1867 births
1913 deaths
New Zealand cricketers
Canterbury cricketers
Cricketers from Christchurch